Tracy Dockray (born 1962) is an American artist. She illustrated the current HarperCollins editions of Beverly Cleary's children's novels.

Biography
Tracy Dockray spent her early years growing up on the plains of Texas before moving to New York where she attained an MFA from the Pratt Institute. She moved from mural painting to puppet design to fabric design before she found her passion creating children's books.  She currently resides in Greenwich Village, New York with her husband, children, and pets. She is mostly known for the popular series by Beverly Cleary that she illustrated which includes the Ramona Series and the Mouse and the Motorcycle Series. Most recently she illustrated the Fix-It Friends Series by Nicole C. Kear.  Altogether, Dockray has illustrated over 25 books. Her careers throughout the years included the following:
puppetry
sculpture
illustrating
painting murals
school playgrounds
hospitals
children's rooms

Information
Dockray has participated in the Learning Inc. Literacy Programs as well as the Learning Leaders Author's Read-aloud Program that is located in New York.  She has contributed to the annual Children's Literary Event that is located at the Bethlehem Center in Dallas, Texas. Dockray is a member of the Society of Illustrators.

Bibliography
 Fix-It Friends books 1-4 by Nicole C. Kear
 Izzy and Oscar by Allison Estes
 Stay! by Lois Lowry
 The Scare in My Hair by Tracy Dockray
 The Lost and Found Pony by Tracy Dockray
 Sweet Baby Feet byMargaret O'hair
 The Tushy Book by Fran Manushkin
 Jammy Dance by Rebecca Janni
 Hear That? by Tama Janowitz
 My Bunny Diary by Tracy Dockray
 Delia at the Delano by Bob Morris
 Grimm's Grimmest by Tracy Dockray

Books by Beverly Cleary
 Beezus and Ramona
 Ramona the Pest
 Ramona the Brave
 Ramona and Her Father
 Ramona and Her Mother
 Ramona Quimby, Age 8
 Ramona Forever
 Ramona's World
 The Mouse and the Motorcycle
 Runaway Ralph
 Ralph S. Mouse
"Henry Huggins"
"Henry and Beezus"
"Henry and Ribsy"
"Henry and the Paper Route"
"Henry and the Clubhouse"
"Mich and Amy"
"Muggie Maggie"
"Socks"
"Ribsy"
"Emily's Runaway Imagination"
"Otis Spofford"

References

External links

 Tracy Dockray at harpercollinschildrens.com
 Tracy Dockray's Website

1962 births
Living people
20th-century American women artists
American children's book illustrators
Artists from Texas
Pratt Institute alumni
Tracy
21st-century American women